Charles Merrill Neinas (born January 18, 1932 in Wisconsin) is a former commissioner of the Big Eight Conference from 1971 to 1980.  Neinas also served as interim commissioner of the Big 12 Conference from 2011 to 2012. He was the 1996 Amos Alonzo Stagg Award winner.

References

External links
 

1932 births
Living people
Big 12 Conference commissioners
Big Eight Conference commissioners